A linkback is a method for Web authors to obtain notifications when other authors link to one of their documents. This enables authors to keep track of who is linking to, or referring to, their articles. The four methods (refback, trackback, pingback and webmention) differ in how they accomplish this task.

Overview
"Linkback" is the generalized term used to reference four methods of communication between websites. While sometimes confused with one another, linkbacks and backlinks are not the same type of entity. A backlink is what the person referring to a page creates while a linkback is what the publisher of the page being referred to receives.

Any of the four terms—linkback, trackback, pingback, or (rarely) refback—might also refer colloquially to items within a section upon the linked page that display the received notifications, usually along with a reciprocal link; trackback is used most often for this purpose. Also, the word trackback is often used colloquially to mean any kind of linkback.

See also
 Backlink
 Page rank
 Search engine optimization

References

Blogs
WordPress